Smets is a Dutch occupational surname. It is a common name in the Belgian provinces of Antwerp and Flemish Brabant (11,000 people in 1998). Despite its similarity to the Dutch surnames Smet, Smits, and Smeets, each equivalent to Smith, Smets (sometimes?) originated from "des Mets", short for "des Metselaars" ("the mason's son"). People named Smets include:

Alexander Smets (1795–1862), French philanthropist
Dieudonné Smets (1901–1981), Belgian road cyclist
Henri Smets (1895–1994), Belgian cross country athlete
Joël Smets (born 1969), Belgian motocross rider
Rob Smets (born 1959), American rodeo bullfighter and commentator
Sonja Smets, Belgian and Dutch logician
 (1796–1848), German writer, journalist and politician

SMETS, short for Smart Metering Equipment Technical Specifications, is a British standard for home smart meters.

See also
Smet
Smits
Smeets
De Smet (surname)

Dutch-language surnames
Surnames of Belgian origin
Occupational surnames